The 2017 Alabama State Hornets football team represented Alabama State University as a member of the East Division of the Southwestern Athletic Conference (SWAC) during 2017 NCAA Division I FCS football season. The Hornets were led by third-year head coach Brian Jenkins for the first five games of the season before he was fired. Donald Hill-Eley was named the interim head coach for the remainder of the season. Alabama State compiled an overall record of 5–6 with a mark of 4–3 in conference play, placing second in the SWAC East Division. The team played home games at New ASU Stadium in Montgomery, Alabama.

Schedule

References

Alabama State
Alabama State Hornets football seasons
Alabama State Hornets football